Beradust Rural District is in Sumay-ye Beradust District of Urmia County, West Azerbaijan province, Iran. At the National Census of 2006, its population was 13,766 in 2,378 households. There were 11,593 inhabitants in 2,518 households at the following census of 2011. At the most recent census of 2016, the population of the rural district was 11,361 in 2,496 households. The largest of its 55 villages was Gangachin, with 2,488 people.

References 

Urmia County

Rural Districts of West Azerbaijan Province

Populated places in West Azerbaijan Province

Populated places in Urmia County